St. Michael Church was built in suburb of Uzhok, Ukraine in 1745. The structure consists of three wooden naves and a brick sacristy.

On June 21, 2013, at the 37th Session of the UNESCO World Heritage Committee, Holy Trinity Church was added as a UNESCO World Heritage Site.  It was among 16 wooden tserkvas of Carpathian Region in Poland and Ukraine to be added.

References 

Wooden tserkvas of Carpathian region in Poland and Ukraine
World Heritage Sites in Ukraine
Churches completed in 1745
Ukrainian Catholic churches in Ukraine